Patrick Kavanagh (born 1952) is an Irish former Gaelic footballer and hurler. At club level he played with Blackrock and St. Michael's and was also a member of the Cork senior football team.

Career

Kavanagh first played hurling at juvenile and underage levels with Blackrock. He was part of the club's minor team that won three successive Cork MHC titles from 1967 to 1969. Kavanagh subsequently joined the Blackrock senior team and was part of three All-Ireland SCHC-winning teams. His performances at underage club level earned a call-up to the Cork minor hurling team and, after losing the 1968 All-Ireland minor final to Wexford, went on to secure consecutive All-Ireland MHC titles in 1969 and as team captain in 1970. Kavanagh was drafted onto the Cork under-21 team while still a member of the minor side and he won three All-Ireland U21HC titles in four seasons from 1970 to 1973. He never earned selection with the Cork senior hurling team. Kavanagh was part of the St. Michael's senior team that lost three successive Cork SFC finals from 1976 to 1978.  He lined out with the Cork senior football team during the 1979 Munster SFC.

Honours

Blackrock
All-Ireland Senior Club Hurling Championship: 1972, 1974, 1979
Munster Senior Club Hurling Championship: 1971, 1973, 1975, 1978, 1979
Cork Senior Hurling Championship: 1971, 1973, 1975, 1978, 1979, 1985
Cork Minor Hurling Championship: 1967, 1968, 1969

Cork
All-Ireland Under-21 Hurling Championship: 1970, 1971, 1973
Munster Under-21 Hurling Championship: 1970, 1971, 1973
All-Ireland Minor Hurling Championship: 1969, 1970 (c)
Munster Minor Hurling Championship: 1968, 1969, 1970 (c)

References

1952 births
Living people
Blackrock National Hurling Club hurlers
St Michael's (Cork) Gaelic footballers
Cork inter-county hurlers
Cork inter-county Gaelic footballers